Mostafa Sharifat (born 16 September 1987 in Ahvaz) is an Iranian volleyball player who plays as a middle blocker for the Iran national team. He competed at the 2015 Asian Championship and the 2016 Summer Olympics.

Honours

National team
Asian Championship
Silver medal (1): 2015
U21 World Championship
Bronze medal (1): 2007
Asian U20 Championship
Gold medal (1): 2006
Asian U18 Championship
Gold medal (1): 2005

Club
Asian Championship
Gold medal (1): 2014 (Matin)
Iranian Super League
Champions (1): 2014 (Matin)
Runners-up (1): 2013 (Matin)

Individual
Best Middle Blocker: 2014 Asian Club Championship
Best Middle Blocker: 2014 Asian Cup
Best Middle Blocker: 2015 Asian Championship

References

External links 

 Mostafa Sharifat on Instagram

1987 births
Living people
Iranian men's volleyball players
People from Ahvaz
Olympic volleyball players of Iran
Volleyball players at the 2016 Summer Olympics
Sportspeople from Khuzestan province
Islamic Solidarity Games competitors for Iran